Richard Duncan (died February 1819) was a soldier, judge and political figure in Upper Canada.

He was born in Berwick-upon-Tweed, England. He came to New York state in 1755 with his father, who was a lieutenant in the 44th Regiment of Foot in the British Army, and joined the army himself in 1758. From 1765-1767 he served as an Ensign with the 55th (Westmorland) Regiment of Foot in Ireland. After the end of the Seven Years' War, he was involved in the fur trade in the Great Lakes area. He fought with the King's Royal Regiment of New York during the American Revolution. After John Burgoyne's surrender at Saratoga, he went to Quebec and joined the loyalist troops there. He commanded a company in the KRRNY during the Valley Campaigns in 1779 - 1781, including at the Battle of Klock's Field where he performed with "great gallantry and success".

In 1788, he became a judge and a member of the land board in the Lunenburg District. In 1792, he became lieutenant for the county of Dundas and a member of the Legislative Council of Upper Canada. Duncan spent much of his time looking after his business interests in New York and was dropped from the council for non-attendance in 1805.

Duncan was mostly residing in New York after 1809 or 1810 and died at his father's estate near Schenectady, New York in 1819.

External links 
Biography at the Dictionary of Canadian Biography Online

1819 deaths
Members of the Legislative Council of Upper Canada
English emigrants to pre-Confederation Ontario
United Empire Loyalists
People from Berwick-upon-Tweed
Upper Canada judges
Immigrants to the Province of Quebec (1763–1791)
Province of Quebec (1763–1791) judges
1740 births